Justice Nure Alam Chowdhury was a former acting Chief Justice in Calcutta High Court and former Minister of Animal Resources Development in the Government of West Bengal. He was also an MLA, elected from the Murarai constituency in the 2011 West Bengal state assembly election.

References 

State cabinet ministers of West Bengal
Living people
West Bengal MLAs 2011–2016
Trinamool Congress politicians from West Bengal
1943 births